Godfrey Herbert Winn (15 October 1906 – 19 June 1971) was an English journalist known as a columnist, and also a writer and actor.

Born in Kings Norton, Warwickshire, he attended King Edward's School, Birmingham. His career as a theatre actor began as a boy at the Haymarket Theatre and he appeared in many plays and films. He went on to write a number of novels and biographical works, and became a star columnist for the Daily Mirror and the Sunday Express newspapers, where he wrote "Dear Abby" articles for lovelorn women. Journalists nicknamed him 'Winifred God' because of his popularity with women readers. Winn was gay and never married.

In 1939, Winn was the first British war correspondent to cross the Maginot Line. He served as a Royal Navy able seaman, during the Second World War, training at HMS Ganges and becoming a CW (Commission Candidate Wartime) before injury led to his medical discharge. His book 'Home From Sea' published in 1943 recounts his life in the Royal Navy. Another book, PQ17, was an account of his experiences, as a journalist, on Convoy PQ 17 during the Second World War. After the war, he wrote numerous books and magazine articles, and appeared on radio and television as well as in films. He frequently compered the BBC Radio show Housewives' Choice, with David Jacobs, from the early 1950s to the mid 1960s. He was a friend of W. Somerset Maugham and it is said that the character George Potter in Maugham's 1941 book Strictly Personal was based on him.

He was the subject of This Is Your Life in 1961 when he was surprised by Eamonn Andrews

Winn died from a heart attack at the age of 64, while playing tennis at home in Brighton.

Bibliography

 Dreams Fade (1928)
 Squirrel's Cage (1929)
 The Unequal Conflict
 Fly Away, Youth
 Communion on Earth
 I May Be Wrong
 Personality Parade
 A Month of Sundays
 For My Friends
 On Going to the Wars
 The Hour Before the Dawn
 The Kind of People We Are
 Scrapbook of the War
 Home from the Sea (1944)
 Scrapbook of Victory
 P.Q.17
 This Fair Country 
 Going My Way
 The Bend of the River
 The Younger Sister (Biography)
 The Younger Queen (Biography)
 The Queen's Countrywoman (Biography)
 One Man's Dog (Biography)
 The Quest For Healing (Biography)
 Personal Pages (Biography)
 Infirm Glory (Volume 1 of his Autobiography).
 The Positive Hour (Volume 2 of his Autobiography)
 Here Is My Space (Volume 3 of his Autobiography)

Filmography

Footnotes

External links
 

1906 births
1971 deaths
English male journalists
People from Birmingham, West Midlands
People educated at King Edward's School, Birmingham
English male child actors
English male stage actors
English male film actors
20th-century English male actors
20th-century English novelists
British male novelists
British gay writers
20th-century English male writers
Royal Navy personnel of World War II
Royal Navy sailors
British LGBT journalists
English LGBT writers
20th-century English LGBT people